Waldomiro Freitas Autran Dourado (1926 – September 30, 2012) was a Brazilian novelist.

Dourado was born in Patos de Minas, state of Minas Gerais. Going against current trends in Brazilian literature, Dourado's works display much concern with literary form, with many obscure words and expressions. Minas Gerais is the setting for most of Dourado's books, resembling the early to mid-20th century regionalist trend in Brazilian literature. Most literary critics consider Dourado's work to have similarities to Baroque literature.

In 1982, Dourado won the Jabuti Prize.

In 2000, Dourado won the Camões Prize, the most important literary prize in the Portuguese language.

In 2001, Brazilian filmmaker Suzana Amaral released the film Uma Vida em Segredo. It was based on the novel of same title by Autran Dourado.

Dourado died of stomach bleeding on September 30, 2012, in Rio de Janeiro. He was 86 years old.

Selected novels 
 Uma Vida em Segredo 1964 - translated as A Hidden Life
 Ópera dos Mortos 1967 - translated as Voices of the Dead
 O Risco do Bordado 1970 - translated as Pattern for a Tapestry
 Os Sinos da Agonia 1974 - translated as Bells of Agony
 Ópera dos Fantoches 1995
 As Imaginações Pecaminosas (Jabuti Prize 1982)
 A Serviço Del-Rei 1984
 Confissões de Narciso 1997

Novels with English translations are posted above with their American titles.

Reviews
 McCabe, Brian (1981), review of The Voices of the Dead, in Cencrastus No. 6, Autumn 1981, p. 42

References

External links

1926 births
2012 deaths
20th-century Brazilian novelists
20th-century Brazilian male writers
Brazilian male novelists
Camões Prize winners
Deaths from gastrointestinal hemorrhage